Augie (sometimes spelled Auggie) is a nickname for variations of the name August, which derives from the Latin name Augustus. It may refer to:

People 
Augie Auer (1940–2007), meteorologist
Augie Galan (1912–1993), Major League Baseball player
Augie Bergamo (1917–1974), Major League Baseball player
Augie Blunt (1929–1999), actor
Augie Donatelli (1914–1990), Major League Baseball umpire
Augie Garrido (b. 1939), college baseball coach
Augie Hiebert (1916–2007), Alaskan television pioneer
Augie Hoffmann (b. 1981), American football player
Augie Johns (1899–1975), Major League Baseball player
Augie Lohman (1911–1989), American special effects artist
Augie Lio (1918–1989), American football player
Augie Meyers (b. 1940), musician
Augie Nieto (b. 1958), fitness executive
Augie Ojeda (b. 1974), Major League Baseball player
Jacob Orgen (1893–1927), New York gangster nicknamed "Little Augie"
Augie Prudhomme (1902–1992), Major League Baseball player
Augie Rodriguez, musician
Augie Rios, a musician best known for the song "¿Dónde Está Santa Claus?"
Augie Sanchez (b. 1977), featherweight boxer
Augie Schmidt (b. 1961), college baseball coach
Auggie Smith (born 1970), American comedian
Augie Swentor (1899–1969), Major League Baseball player
Augie T. (b. 1968), Filipino comedian
Auggie Vidovich II (born 1981), American NASCAR driver
Augie Visocchi, a musician best known for his work with the rock band The Hard Lessons
Augie Walsh (1904–1985), Major League Baseball player
Augie Wolf (b. 1961), American shot putter

Fictional characters 
Augie Doggie, an anthropomorphic dog from The Quick Draw McGraw Show
Augie, in the 1995 film Smoke, modeled after the owner of Augie's Jazz Bar
Augie March, the protagonist of Saul Bellow's book The Adventures of Augie March
Augie, a secondary character in the 2013 film Blue Jasmine
Auggie Doggie, a nickname for the main character in the YA book Wonder_(Palacio_novel)

Masculine given names
Hypocorisms